John Spence Reid (August 1, 1942 – July 17, 2022) was an American politician of the Republican Party. He was a member of the Virginia House of Delegates from 1990 to 2008.

References

External links 

1942 births
2022 deaths
Republican Party members of the Virginia House of Delegates
People from Henrico County, Virginia
Politicians from Norfolk, Virginia
University of Virginia alumni
Wofford College alumni
20th-century American politicians
21st-century American politicians